Trévol is a commune in the Allier department in Auvergne-Rhône-Alpes in central France.

History
Etymologically, Trévol comes from the Latin "Tres Valles", which means "Three Valleys" or "trifurcium", (the intersection of three paths). This is also symbolized in the coat of arms of the town. Under the old system (before 1789), Trévol enjoyed some prosperity through its woods, mills and also the relay station "La Perche", where the inn was known and where King Louis XIV stayed on February 11, 1692.

After the Second World War, the lime industry regained some momentum. Today there are no lime kilns anymore.

Population

See also
Communes of the Allier department

References

Communes of Allier
Allier communes articles needing translation from French Wikipedia
Lime kilns in France